Brede Pit and Cutting is a  geological Site of Special Scientific Interest in Brede in East Sussex. It is a Geological Conservation Review site.

This site shows the junction between two formations in the Wealden Group, dating to the Early Cretaceous. It exposes the top 2 metres of the Ashdown Formation and the bottom 1.5 metres of the Wadhurst Clay Formation. The environments change from shallow fluvial to deeper lakes and lagoons and there are fossils of plants, fishes and reptiles.

The site is private land with no public access.

References

Sites of Special Scientific Interest in East Sussex
Geological Conservation Review sites
Pit and Cutting